Gorgol may refer to:
 Gorgol Region, Mauritania
 Gorgol River, Mauritania